Teds or TEDS may refer to
Transducer Electronic Data Sheet
Teddy Boys, particularly 1970s revivalists.
Trinity Evangelical Divinity School
The Ellen DeGeneres Show
Twins Early Development Study
The Ethical Debating Society
TETRA Enhanced Data Service
Tactical Eye Devices, a US Army term for eyeglasses
Thrombo Embolus Deterrent Stockings- Anti-Embolism Compression Stockings

See also
Ted (disambiguation)
TED (disambiguation)
Ted's Hot Dogs